Taviton Street is a street in the Bloomsbury district of central London, in the London Borough of Camden. It runs between Endsleigh Gardens in the north and Gordon Square and Endsleigh Place in the south. University College London's School of Slavonic and East European Studies moved into new buildings on the western side in 2005.

Former residents

According to the Survey of London, the former residents include:
 No. 6. 	1853, Rev. Jasper Peck.
 No. 8. 	1888–1902, Hugh Price Hughes (1847–1902), Methodist divine and leader of the "forward" party in Methodism. Edited the Methodist Times.
 No. 10. 	1893–1900, Rev. William Tundall.
 No. 17. 	1866–1877, The Dowager Viscountess Sidmouth. Born Mary Young, eldest daughter of Rev. John Young, rector of Thorpe Malsor, Northamptonshire. She married William Leonard Addington, second Viscount Sidmouth, in 1820.
 No. 20. 	1862–1866, Rev. J. Fearnley.
 No. 24. 	1883–1885, Rev. James Mathew Roberton.
Noor Inayat Khan once resided in Taviton Street.

References

External links 

Bloomsbury
Streets in the London Borough of Camden